KLBN is a commercial radio station located in Fresno, California, broadcasting on 101.9 FM.  KLBN airs a Regional Mexican music format branded as "La Buena".  Its studios are located just north of downtown Fresno, and the transmitter tower is in Meadow Lakes in the Sierra National Forest.

KLBN broadcasts two channels in HD.

History

The 101.9 license in Fresno was awarded to KARM, The George Harm Station, on October 3, 1949, after having broadcast since the previous year. KARM-FM remained such and co-owned with KARM through 1975.

When the station was sold to Lake Enterprises in 1975, a call letter change to KFRE-FM was also applied for. (It would have been the second KFRE-FM, after the previous one was sold in 1971.) Another Fresno station, KFYE, objected to the similarity and had its petition to deny upheld. Ultimately, the station settled on KFRY.

From 1988 to 2008, except for the early 1990s, the station was KOQO. La Super Q until It became KLBN in 2008.

Previous logo

References

External links

FCC History Cards for KLBN

LBN
Regional Mexican radio stations in the United States
Radio stations established in 1949
1949 establishments in California
LBN
Lotus Communications stations